


Philip Marie Constant Bancroft O'Connor (8 September 1916 – 29 May 1998) was a British writer and surrealist poet, who also painted. He was one of the 'Wheatsheaf writers' of 1930s Fitzrovia (who took their name from a pub). 

In his Memoirs of a Public Baby (1958, Faber and Faber) O'Connor wrote about his early life, which was "shrouded in a good deal of mystery and make-believe". According to O'Connor, his father, Bernard, was an Oxford-educated surgeon of sophisticated tastes, descended from the last High King of Ireland; he allegedly died early in the First World War whilst serving in the Navy. Notwithstanding O'Connor's account, "neither the Admiralty, Oxford University nor the various doctors' registers are able to authenticate" what he wrote. His mother considered his father "riff-raff" and "a cad". She was Winifred Xavier Rodyke-Thompson, of an Irish Roman Catholic family; she claimed her grandfather had been born into the Spring Rice family headed by Baron Monteagle of Brandon, later changing his name. During O'Connor's childhood, his mother founded the Somerset Cigarette Agency and secured a government contract to produce inferior cigarettes for supply to soldiers.

Memoirs of a Public Baby was followed by The Lower View (1960), Living in Croesor (1962) and Vagrancy (1963). He was a heavy drinker and (at the very least) massively eccentric, living a mainly parasitic life. In his own words, he "bathed in life and dried [himself] on the typewriter".

In 1963, O'Connor interviewed an acquaintance, Quentin Crisp, for the BBC Third Programme. A publisher who happened to hear the broadcast was impressed by Crisp's performance, and as an indirect result of O'Connor's interview, Crisp ended up writing The Naked Civil Servant.

He fathered "an unknown number of attractive and intelligent children", including Philip, Max, Sarah, Peter, John, Allaye, Patric, and Rachel, the eight children referenced in his obituary in The New York Times. His first wife, married in 1941, was lawyer's daughter Jean Mary Hore, who was sent to a mental hospital after an attempt on her husband's life; she lived until 1997, having been confined for over fifty years. Jean was also the unrequited love of Paul Potts, who wrote about her in Dante Called You Beatrice (1960). In 1963 O'Connor married secondly (Anne) Nicolle Gaillard-d'Andel; Memoirs of a Public Baby is dedicated to Anna Wing, the actress and his third partner with whom he had a son, Jon, an education consultant and former teacher. O'Connor met the American heiress Panna Grady in 1967 and later settled with her in the Gard, in France, until his death in 1998. They never married. Two sons, Maxim and Félix, were born from their union.

Works

Books 
 Memoirs of a Public Baby (1958).
 The Lower View (1960).
 Steiner's Tour (1960).
 Living in Croesor (1962).
 Vagrancy (1963).
 Selected Poems 1936/1966 (1968)
 Arias of Water (1978-1980)

Radio 
 He Who Refrains (1959).
 A Morality (1959).
 Anathema (1962).
 Success (1967), conversations with Philip Toynbee, Sir Michael Redgrave, Malcolm Muggeridge and John Berger.

Biography 
 Andrew Barrow, Quentin and Philip (2002), Macmillan, 559 pages, . Dual biography of Quentin Crisp and his friend Philip O'Connor.

References

External links
 Robert McG. Thomas Jr. "Philip O'Connor, 81, Acerbic Memoirist, Dies", The New York Times, 4 June 1998.
Archival Material at 

1916 births
1998 deaths
British radio personalities
People from Leighton Buzzard
20th-century British poets
British male poets
20th-century British male writers